This article shows all participating team squads at the 2015 Men's European Volleyball Championship, held in Bulgaria and Italy from 9–18 October 2015.

The following is the Belarusian roster in the 2015 Men's European Volleyball Championship.

The following is the Belgian roster in the 2015 Men's European Volleyball Championship.

The following is the Bulgarian roster in the 2015 Men's European Volleyball Championship.

The following is the Croatian roster in the 2015 Men's European Volleyball Championship.

The following is the Czech roster in the 2015 Men's European Volleyball Championship.

The following is the Estonian roster in the 2015 Men's European Volleyball Championship.

The following is the Finnish roster in the 2015 Men's European Volleyball Championship.

The following is the French roster in the 2015 Men's European Volleyball Championship.

The following is the German roster in the 2015 Men's European Volleyball Championship.

The following is the Italian roster in the 2015 Men's European Volleyball Championship.

The following is the Dutch roster in the 2015 Men's European Volleyball Championship.

The following is the Polish roster in the 2015 Men's European Volleyball Championship.

The following is the Russian roster in the 2015 Men's European Volleyball Championship.

The following is the Serbian roster in the 2015 Men's European Volleyball Championship.

The following is the Slovak roster in the 2015 Men's European Volleyball Championship.

The following is the Slovenian roster in the 2015 Men's European Volleyball Championship.

References
Official Website

S
E